

Men's 100 m Backstroke - Final

Men's 100 m Backstroke - Semifinals

Men's 100 m Backstroke - Semifinal 01

Men's 100 m Backstroke - Semifinal 02

Men's 100 m Backstroke - Heats

Men's 100 m Backstroke - Heat 01

Men's 100 m Backstroke - Heat 02

Men's 100 m Backstroke - Heat 03

Men's 100 m Backstroke - Heat 04

Swimming at the 2006 Commonwealth Games